This is a list of radio stations that broadcast in the Chinese language.

East Asia

Mainland China
China Radio International (CRI) is a government controlled media outlet. Typical programs include Tang Ren Jie and others. The weather is typically announced for cities such as Beijing, Shanghai, Guangzhou, Guilin, Ürümqi, Xi'an, Hong Kong, Macau, and Taipei. International cities weather is usually announced for New York City, Washington, Seattle, Sydney, Bangkok, London, Paris, Madrid, Cairo, Nairobi, and others.

In Beijing, China Radio International can be heard at 88.7 MHz FM and 91.5 MHz FM and some other frequencies.

Beijing
Most Beijing radio stations are controlled by the Beijing Broadcasting Network (Beijing Renmin Guangbo Diantai). Radio frequencies such as 97.4 MHz FM is for music. Other Beijing radio stations include China Radio International's Easy FM on 88.7 MHz FM and 91.5 MHz FM.

Guangdong
Guangdong is home to Radio Guangdong and many other radio stations. The following list is incomplete:

Harbin
Harbin Economy Radio controls two of the radio stations in Harbin.

Lanzhou
Lanzhou's radio stations are controlled by the Lanzhou Radio group.

Nanjing
Nanjing's radio stations are primarily controlled by Nanjing Radio, a subsidiary of Nanjing Television Broadcast Group. The channels contain a variety of programming including local news, business, sports, a kids channel, traffic, and music.

Shanghai
The Shanghai Media Group, part of the Shanghai Media & Entertainment Group conglomerate controls a fair number of radio stations in Shanghai. The radio stations broadcast local news, traffic, music (popular, classical, and light), and a variety of other programs.

Shenzhen
Shenzhen Radio Station controls four of several radio stations in Shenzhen.

Tianjin
Tianjin's radio stations are controlled by the Tianjin People's Broadcasting Station with a variety of programs including news, traffic, music and others.

Urumqi
Ürümqi's radio stations are controlled by the Urumqi People Broadcasting Station group.

Xi'an
Xi'an's radio stations are controlled by Jin Hao. Programs include news, music, and fashion on at least seven radio stations.

Hong Kong

Commercial Radio Hong Kong broadcasts at 88.1 FM (talk), 90.3 FM (Cantonese pop, youth), and 864 AM (English).
Metro Broadcast Corporation Limited consists of 3 radio channels: Metro Finance (FM104), Metro Showbiz (FM99.7) and Metro Plus (AM 1044).
Radio Television Hong Kong (RTHK):

Macau
Rádio Macau broadcasts in Cantonese on FM 100.7 MHz.
Radio Vilaverde Lda broadcasts in Cantonese on FM 99.5 MHz.

Taiwan
BCC is the largest radio network company in Taiwan.
Radio Taiwan International broadcasts news about Taiwan in Mandarin, Cantonese, English, Spanish, French, and many other languages.
KISS Radio plays mostly Chinese popular music and English top 40.
Hit Fm in Taiwan also plays Chinese popular music

Southeast Asia

Brunei
There are currently no FM radio stations in Brunei that are fully operated in Chinese.  The daily Chinese programs for Pilihan FM is between 09:00-11:00 in the morning, and between 16:00-19:00 at night.
 Radio Television Brunei
 Pilihan FM (95.9FM/96.9FM)

Indonesia
Most of the Indonesia FM radio stations indicated below are not fully operated in Chinese.

Jakarta
 Mandarin Station 98.3 FM
 Sunday Mandarin PAS FM

Bandung
 Suara Indah 美声 92.1FM

Medan
 A-Radio Medan, 103.8 MHz FM
 Mix FM, 90.8 MHz FM
 City Radio 城市之音, 95.9 MHz FM

Surabaya
 Global Mandarin@Global FM
 Strato 101.9 FM

Semarang
 PAS FM (Sunday Mandarin) 106.00

Palembang
 El John Radio, 95.9 MHz FM
 Sonora, 92.6 MHz FM

Pangkal Pinang
 Palupi 华语广播电台 FM, 103.5;MHz FM
 El John Radio, 88.5 MHz FM

Pontianak
 Primadona FM, 99.1 MHz FM

Malaysia
 988 FM
 Ai FM
 City Plus FM
 goXuan
 Melody
 My
 8FM
 TEA FM （content is 60% Chinese and 40% English）

Singapore
As of September 2017, there are three licensed broadcasters of terrestrial radio in Singapore, offering a total of 6 Chinese-language FM radio stations. The national public broadcaster, Mediacorp Radio operates 3 stations, the media organisation  SPH Media Trust manages 2 radio stations, and So Drama! Entertainment owns the remaining Chinese radio station. All the radio channels are fully operated in Chinese and provide around-the-clock service. They broadcast a wide variety of programs, including news, music, infotainment and Public Service Announcements to inform, educate and entertain all audiences.

 So Drama! Entertainment
 88.3Jia
 SPH Media Trust
 96.3 Hao FM 
UFM 100.3
 Mediacorp Radio 
 YES 933
 Capital 958 
 Love 972

Oceania

Australia
SBS Radio broadcasts two hour-long daily programmes for the Chinese audience in Australia: one programme in Mandarin and one programme in Cantonese.

 Perth Chinese Radio 104.9 FM, located in Perth, broadcasts in Mandarin and Cantonese 24/7 and was established in 2007.

 3ACR AM 1629 Radio is located in Melbourne, and founded in 2011. The station targets local Chinese Australians and airs mainly news, cultural and other programs.

New Zealand
AM936
 New Zealand Chinese Radio FM 90.6
Love FM 99.4

Europe

France
 Radio France Internationale
 Radio Mandarin d'Europe

Germany
 Deutsche Welle

Romania
 Radio Romania International

Russia
 Voice of Russia

United Kingdom
Spectrum Radio|  The Only Daily Chinese Radio in the United Kingdom since 1990. Broadcasting from London on Spectrum Online – Daily Cantonese broadcast 18:00–19:00, and daily Mandarin broadcast 19:00–20:00
 British Broadcasting Corporation
 BBC GMR Eastern Horizon, Manchester The UK's first local Chinese radio service since 1983 – Was broadcast every Sunday 19.00–21.00.
 BBC Radio Merseyside Orient Express, Liverpool Mondays 9-10pm with June Yee and Billy Hui. Broadcast since 1980s. 
 Unity 101 Under The Same Sky, Southampton Mondays 6pm-8pm.
 London Chinese Radio is an online community radio station in London run by volunteers, and is a registered charity. Most programmes are in Mandarin, and past programmes are available for download.

Vatican
 Vatican Radio

Americas

Canada
There are a number of stations well known within the Chinese community in Canada that contain a certain number of programs in Chinese. However, due to the ethnic broadcasting policy made by the CRTC, there are currently no AM/FM radio stations in Canada that are fully operated in Chinese. Also, campus radios in Canada allows broadcasting their program in any language, including Chinese, but not a lot of them are known to the public.

Fairchild Radio, which is owned by Fairchild Group, is the biggest Chinese broadcasting company in Canada and produces Chinese programs in the following stations:
Calgary: FM 94.7 
Toronto: AM 1430 and FM 88.9
Vancouver: AM 1470 and FM 96.1

 There are other stations which air Chinese programs in the following region:
 Edmonton: CKER 101.7 FM - Owned and operated Akash Broadcasting Inc.
 Markham: FM 105.9 "Chinese Radio Network"
 Montreal: CFMB AM 1280 - Owned and operated by Evanov Radio Group
 Ottawa: FM 97.9 - Owned and operated by CHIN Radio/TV International
 Toronto: AM 1540 "A1 Chinese Radio"
 Vancouver: AM 1320 "Overseas Chinese Voice" - Owned and operated by Mainstream Broadcasting Corporation

United States
Chinese Radio Seattle. (M-T 9:00pm–12:00am Fri-Sun 7:00pm-12:1m AM1150 KKNW/HD-3 FM 98.9/Mobile App: Chinese Radio Seattle) Studio in Bellevue, WA.
China Radio International can be heard in the following cities:
Washington DC on WUST (AM 1120 kHz between 9 a.m.–11 a.m.)
Chinese American Voice,  heard over a SCA subcarrier of WACD-FM in the New York/New Jersey/Connecticut tri-state area
Chinese American Voice, heard in New York City 24 hours on the 92 kHz subcarrier of WQCD-FM 101.9 MHz.
Chinese Radio Network  on WGBB (AM 1240 kHz and the 67 kHz subcarrier of WCBS-FM 101.1 MHz, Flushing, New York) broadcasts in Mandarin.
Chung Wah Chinese Broadcasting Company  heard in New York City 24 hours on the 92 kHz subcarrier of WSKQ-FM 97.9 MHz.
Multicultural Radio Broadcasting Inc.'s Chinese Media Group broadcasts Chinese programming in the following cities:
KAHZ, Los Angeles is a Mandarin-dialect station.
KAZN, Los Angeles is a Mandarin-dialect station.
KTWR, Guam  is a shortwave radio station that broadcasts in Mandarin and other languages to the Asia-Pacific region. 
KMRB, Los Angeles is a Cantonese-dialect station.
Sinocast Radio, national Chinese network, heard in New York City on the 67 kHz subcarrier of WXRK-FM 92.3 MHz.
WKDM, New York/New Jersey/Connecticut tri-state area is a Mandarin-dialect station on AM 1380 kHz.
WZRC, New York/New Jersey/Connecticut tri-state area is a Cantonese-dialect station on AM 1480 kHz.
Radio Taiwan International is broadcast on WYFR from Okeechobee, Florida on shortwave 5950 kHz in the United States sometime after 5 p.m./6 p.m. until early morning. This broadcast can be received virtually through the entire United States using a short wave radio.
KVTO (Sing Tao) on 1400AM in San Francisco.
KEST, San Francisco is a Cantonese-dialect station.
KSQQ, San Francisco is a Mandarin-dialect station.

Africa

Kenya
China Radio International is at 91.9 MHz FM in Nairobi.

South Africa
 ArrowLine Chinese Radio (www.ArrowLineRadio.com) is on AM 1269 in Johannesburg

See also 
 Media in China
 Ethnic broadcasting in China
 Media in Hong Kong
 Media of Taiwan
 Media of Macau

References

External links

 List

Lists of radio stations by language